Dame Joanna Margaret Cruickshank,  (28 November 1875 – 16 August 1958) was a British military nurse and nursing administrator. She founded Princess Mary's Royal Air Force Nursing Service in November 1918 and served as its first Matron-in-Chief from 1921 until her retirement in November 1930.

Biography

Joanna Margaret Cruickshank was born the second daughter of William and Johanna Cruickshank on 28 November 1875 in Murree, India (now in Pakistan). She trained at Guy's Hospital, London, then travelled back to India in 1912 to serve as sister in the Lady Minto Nursing Association. In 1917 she joined Queen Alexandra's Imperial Military Nursing Service (QAIMNS). After contracting a malignant form of malaria, and suffering a series of fevers, she was invalided home to Britain in March 1918. She was made a Dame Commander of the Order of the British Empire in 1931.

In 1940, Cruickshank was named Commandant of the Rushen Women's and Married Internees Camp on the Isle of Man; she was later succeeded by Detective Inspector Cuthbert of New Scotland Yard.

Dame Joanna Cruickshank died in Sussex at age 82 in 1958. The Dame Joanna Cruickshank Ladies Singles tournament (Princess Mary's Royal Air Force Nursing Service) is named in her honour.

References

Sources
Cuthbert, C. R., Papers of the Commandant of Rushen Women's and Married Internees Camp 1941– 1945 Detective Inspector Cuthbert of New Scotland Yard succeeded Dame Joanna Cruickshank as Commandant. This small deposit contains two volumes of UK and IOM newspaper cuttings relating to internment as well as letters and greeting cards from internees. (Archive Reference# MS 11196)

External links
U.K. government bio of Joanna Cruickshank
NCBI abstract
RAF Nursing Service website

 

 
 
 

British nursing administrators
Dames Commander of the Order of the British Empire
British women in World War II
1875 births
1958 deaths
British women in World War I
Members of the Royal Red Cross
Princess Mary's Royal Air Force Nursing Service officers
Royal Air Force personnel of World War I
Queen Alexandra's Royal Army Nursing Corps officers
British Army personnel of World War I
British people in colonial India